Silvio Lagreca (14 June 1895 – 29 April 1966) was a Brazilian football manager. He was the first manager of Brazilian Football Confederation in 1914 alongside Rubens Sales and after in 1940.

Lagreca was born in Piracicaba, Brazil.  Prior to becoming a manager, he was a player and referee in soccer. In the first edition of Copa América (Copa Sul-Americana, until 1967) he played and coached CBF, in clubs he played for São Bento-SP only. He was in many championships, like Campeonato Paulista, Torneio Rio-São Paulo, Roca Cup and Campeonato Sul Americano. Lagreca died in São Paolo.

References

External links 
Profile at cbf.com.br
 Folha de S.Paulo (Information about Lagreca ) (Portuguese)

1895 births
1966 deaths
People from Piracicaba
Brazilian footballers
Brazil international footballers
Association football midfielders
Brazilian football managers
Brazil national football team managers
Sociedade Esportiva Palmeiras managers
Footballers from São Paulo (state)